
The Arctic Aircraft Company was founded in Anchorage, Alaska by Bill Diehl in 1975 to produce an updated version of the Interstate Cadet light aircraft as the Arctic Tern. In 1985, the company closed down, and rights to the aircraft went to the Interstate Aircraft Company.

References
 

1975 establishments in Alaska
1985 disestablishments in Alaska
Aviation in Alaska
Companies based in Anchorage, Alaska
Defunct aircraft manufacturers of the United States
Defunct companies based in Alaska